Events from the year 1934 in Ireland.

Incumbents
 Governor-General: Domhnall Ua Buachalla
 President of the Executive Council: Éamon de Valera (FF)

Events
12 January – Republican Press Ltd. takes a High Court action against the Garda Síochána over the seizure of the An Phoblacht newspaper.
20 January – the funeral of the veteran nationalist Member of Parliament, Joseph Devlin, takes place in Belfast.
5 February – Dublin Corporation debates a letter from the Gaelic League asking for a ban on the broadcast of jazz music on the grounds that it is contrary to the spirit of Christianity and nationality.
7 February – discussions on the formation of a new Volunteer Force leads to an explosive debate in the Dáil. Civil War events are revisited and there are angry exchanges between deputies.
23 February – the Government introduces the Wearing of Uniform (Restriction) Bill 1934. Cumann na nGaedheal opposes what is soon dubbed The Blueshirts Bill.
26 February – 300 pupils from the Christian Brothers schools in Thurles go on strike as a protest against the wearing of blue shirts by a number of their classmates. They parade through the town singing The Soldiers Song.
2 March – the Wearing of Uniform (Restriction) Bill is carried in the Dáil by 80 votes to 60. W. T. Cosgrave condemns the Bill and predicts its failure.
10 March – the National Athletic and Cycling Association decides to ban women from taking part in events and meetings.
17 March – a socialist motion put to the Irish Republican Army convention in Dublin is lost.
18 March – General Eoin O'Duffy addresses 2,500 Blueshirts in Trim Market Square.
27 March – the Irish Hospitals' Sweepstake receives a blow when the Betting and Lotteries Act is passed by the Parliament of the United Kingdom, prohibiting the sale of lottery tickets in the UK.
7–8 April: Republican Congress first meets in Athlone, formed from disaffected socialist ex-members of the Irish Republican Army.
9 April – W. W. McDowell, US Minister to Ireland, dies at a State banquet in his honour at Dublin Castle, between President Éamon de Valera and Mrs. Sinéad de Valera.
2 May – an application to obtain permission for deposed Soviet leader Leon Trotsky to live in Ireland has failed.
August–October – newspaper strike in Dublin.
September – the Republican Congress, at its first annual meeting (held at Rathmines), suffers a split on policy.
December – Republicans demonstrate against the screening at the Savoy Cinema in Dublin of a newsreel of the marriage of Prince George, Duke of Kent, to Princess Marina.

Arts and literature
 3 March – the third Theatre Royal, Dublin, closes.
 6 April – W. B. Yeats shares the Gothenburg Prize for Poetry.
 August–January 1935: Brian O'Nolan publishes the magazine Blather in Dublin.
 18 October – release of Robert J. Flaherty's fictional documentary film Man of Aran in the United States.
 Adolf Mahr is appointed Director of the National Museum of Ireland in Dublin.
 Samuel Beckett publishes his prose collection More Pricks Than Kicks.
 Patricia Lynch publishes her children's book The Turf-Cutter's Donkey: An Irish Story of Mystery and Adventure.
 Francis MacManus publishes his first novel Stand and Give Challenge in Dublin.
 Kate O'Brien publishes her novel The Ante-Room. 
 W. B. Yeats publishes his poetry The King of the Great Clock Tower.

Sport

Football
League of Ireland
Winners: Bohemians
FAI Cup
Winners: Cork 2–1 St James' Gate

Golf
Irish Open is won by Syd Easterbrook (England).

Births
12 January – Edmond Carmody, Roman Catholic bishop in the Diocese of Corpus Christi.
21 January – Audrey Dalton, actress.
3 February – Joseph Duffy, Roman Catholic Bishop of Clogher.
4 February – Tom Cheasty, Waterford hurler (died 2007).
7 February – Rory O'Hanlon, Fianna Fáil TD for Cavan–Monaghan, Cabinet Minister and Ceann Comhairle of Dáil Éireann.
6 March – Mella Carroll, judge of the High Court (died 2006).
7 March – Seán Garland, politician (died 2018)
1 May – Rory Kiely, Fianna Fáil Senator, Cathaoirleach of Seanad Éireann 2002–2007.
4 May – Patrick O'Donoghue, fifth Roman Catholic Bishop of Lancaster in England.
3 May – Larry Gogan, radio disc jockey (died 2020).
19 May – Mark Hely Hutchinson, son of 7th Earl of Donoughmore, chief executive of Guinness Ireland and group chief executive, Bank of Ireland (1983–1991).
29 May – Mick Meagan, soccer player and manager.
4 June – Seamus Elliott, road bicycle racer (died 1971).
7 July – Robert McNeill Alexander, zoologist, authority on animal locomotion (died 2016).
13 July – Brian McCracken, Justice of the Supreme Court, sole member of The McCracken Tribunal into certain payments by Ben Dunne to Charles Haughey and Michael Lowry.
29 July – Patrick Coveney, Roman Catholic Archbishop.
30 July – Kathleen O'Connor, teacher, Clann na Poblachta TD for Kerry North and the youngest ever woman elected to Dáil Éireann (at a by-election in 1956) (died 2017).
31 July – Fergus Bourke, photographer (died 2004).
5 August – Gay Byrne, broadcaster, host of The Late Late Show (died 2019).
25 August – Michael Lynch, Fianna Fáil TD and senator (died 2019).
16 September – Ronnie Drew, singer and folk musician, with The Dubliners (died 2008).
23 September – Thomas Kilroy, playwright and novelist.
26 October – Walton Empey, Archbishop of Dublin (Church of Ireland), Primate of Ireland (1996–2002).
30 October – Noel Dwyer, soccer player (died 1993).
12 November – John McGahern, writer (died 2006).
14 November – Catherine McGuinness, Justice of the Supreme Court, High Court and Circuit Court, Senior Counsel and Senator.
2 December – Harry Perry, welterweight Olympic boxer (died 2021).
Full date unknown
John Bennett, Cork hurler.
Francis John Byrne, historian (died 2017).
Johnny Clifford, Cork hurler (died 2007).

Deaths
1 January – John Crowley, medical doctor, member 1st Dáil representing North Mayo (born 1870).
18 January – Joseph Devlin, Nationalist politician and MP in the British House of Commons and in Northern Ireland (born 1872).
April – Robert McCall, lawyer (born 1849).
29 September – Patrick S. Dinneen, lexicographer and historian (born 1860).
28 November
Seán O'Mahony, Sinn Féin MP (born 1872).
George F. O'Shaunessy, Democrat U.S. Representative from Rhode Island (born 1868).
3 December – Charles James O'Donnell, colonial administrator and MP (born 1849).
Full date unknown – Nathaniel Hill, impressionist painter (born 1861).

References

 
1930s in Ireland
Ireland
Years of the 20th century in Ireland